Culex (Culiciomyia) spathifurca is a species of mosquito belonging to the genus Culex. It is found in Cambodia, India, Indonesia, Malaysia, Maldives, Borneo, Java, Philippines, Philippines, Singapore, Sri Lanka, Irian Jaya, Maluku, and Thailand. This mosquito shows unique male terminalia with bifurcate gonostylus, which can used to differentiate it from other species. Larva and pupa can be found in tree holes associated with mangrove ecosystems. It is a potential vector of Wuchereria bancrofti, but human bitings are very rare.

References

External links 
A note on Culex (Culiciomyia) spathifurca, Edwards.

spathifurca
Insects described in 1915